The Governorate of Livonia, also known as the Livonia Governorate, was a Baltic governorate of the Russian Empire, now divided between Latvia and Estonia.

Geography

The shape of the province is a fairly rectangular in shape, with a maximum length of 246 versts (262 km) and a width of 198 versts (211 km).

The borders are: the Governorate of Estonia to the north, Lake Peipsi and the strait connecting it with Lake Pskov to the east, the Governorate of Pskov and Vitebsk to the south, the Governorate of Courland to the west, and the Gulf of Riga to the west. The length of the western border (the seacoast) is 280 versts (299 km). The area of the Livonian province (according to Strelbitsky) is 41,325.4 square versts (47,030.87 km2).

Geological structure
Geologically the Livonian province and the island belongs to the Silurian, Devonian and modern (dilluvial) period. The first one is spread in the northernmost part of the gubernia and on the islands and consists of dolomites, marls, limestones and sandstones. The middle part of the northern part of the Livonian Gubernia belongs to the middle layer of the Silurian system. In the rest of Livonia the Devonian system of limestones, dolomites, clays with gypsum, marls, sandstones and sands is spread under dilluvial deposits, while the latter rocks form the lower tier of this system and occupy the most of the middle part of the gubernia. This sandstone layer is remarkable for its caves. The middle layer of the Devonian system, made up of dolomites, limestone and clay with gypsum and marl, is spread in the southern part of the Livonian province. Between the rivers Zedde through the Abze and Ogre to the Western Dvina sandstones and sands and partly clay and marl form the upper tier of the Devonian system with the predominance of fish fossils in it. The coastal formations of the province and the erratic boulders covering its surface belong to the latest, or dilluvial, system: under the former there are calcareous tuffs, peaty marls and marshy iron ores; between the latter crystalline rocks (gneiss, granites and syenites, diorites and porphyries) prevail; fossils of the Silurian period are rare.

Mountains
The continuation of the Estonian uplands forms in the Livland province a wide plateau up to 121 m in height, the middle of which is lost in the Wirtz-Erv lowland, but at the edges it is divided into two branches: the Fellin branch, which forms the western watershed of the Livland province, and the eastern one, which forms the watershed between Lake Wirtz-Erv and Chudsky ; the first, reaching a height of 133 m, stretches east to the river Aa, south to Lemsal. Here it is called the Lemsal Plateau; on it is the "Blue Mountain" ( German: Blauberg ), once considered sacred and now still enjoying special respect among Latvians. The second branch is cut by the river Embach, to the south of which it is called the Odenpe Plateau. Near Arral, a plateau terrace of 100 feet (30 m) pushes out of itself in the middle of the swamps the mountain Munna-Megi (up to 800 feet (244 m)) with a blunt cone. The highest plateau of the Livonian province, Gangof, stretches south from Mount Verro, descending to Lake Marienburg, its southwestern spurs connect with the Pebalga, or Aa plateau, between pp. Aa, Evst and Western Dvina. In the northern part of the Gangof plateau there is one of the highest points of the East European plain, Mount Munna-Megi, covered with forests and having a height of 323 m; near it - Vella-Megi, 228 m. To the southeast, the Gangof plateau through the Devil's Mountain continues to the Pskovand Vitebsk provinces.

Piebalga heights are dotted with hundreds of lakes and form a very picturesque area. The highest point here is Mount Gaising-Kalns, 312 m. The slopes to the Gauja River near Sigulda, Turaida, Krimulda and the banks of the Western Dvina near Selburg and even more Koknese are especially beautiful. All this area is replete with many picturesque ruins of castles. On the Piebalga heights are the sources of the Gauja River and many of its tributaries and the Western Dvina. Wooded, covered with meadows, partly peat bogsand the richly irrigated lowlands of the Livland province are located: along the shores of Lake Peipus, around Lake Wirtz-Erva and Pernovskoye  - along the shores of the Gulf of Riga and along the basins of the Pernava and Salis rivers, as well as along the lower reaches of the rivers Aa and Zapadnaya Dvina. This lowland passes to the north into the Estonian, and in the south into the Courland province. Dunes stretch along the coast of the Gulf of Riga, of which the largest, near Gutmansbach, reaches 129 m in height. The lowlands in the eastern part of the province abound in swamps. Wirtz-Jerv lowland, expanding like Lake Wirtz-Jerv, to the north, tapering to the south of the Livland province is a vast plateau rising above the coastal lowland and separating terrace-like uplands from itself. Wavy hills in the east and southeast of the province have in their depths the sources of the main rivers and streams. Once connected with the province of Estland, as well as among themselves, the main islands of the province of Estland, Ezel and Moon, are very similar in their terrain to the province of Estland: a flat hill ( German:  Landrücken ) passes through both, and both on the northern slope of the coast abruptly break off above the sea, forming the so-called Glint (Glint). Moon Island is surrounded, just like Ezel Island, many small islands; near the latter there are also larger ones ( Abro, Filzand, etc.); in the Gulf of Riga - the island of Ruhnu.

Water
The province of Livonia is very rich in water: in the west it is washed by the Gulf of Riga, everywhere abundantly irrigated by 325 rivers; and the lakes in it number up to 1000; of the latter more than half are in Venden County The vast Lake Peipsi in the east washes the Livonian province for over 110 versts (117 km); in the center of the province is the great inland basin of Virz-Yerva; followed by the considerable lakes Burtnek, Luban, Marienburg, etc. - All these lakes are of little commercial and industrial importance for the gubernia so far (except for fishing), but they can be combined into a whole system of water communications, the projects of which have already arisen more than once. On the coastal strip of the Livonian gubernia the Gulf of Riga forms two harbors, accessible to large ships, although the entrance to them is hampered by bars and the tortuosity of the fairway. These harbors are Riga harbor at the mouth of the Western Dvina River and Pernava harbor at the mouth of the river of the same name. The Baltic Sea on the coasts of the Livonian islands is full of small harbors, but uncomfortable due to the shallow water and many reefs and shoals, except Ahrensburg, which is more convenient and has a good roadstead. The main islands that lie in the Baltic Sea and belong to the Livonian province (Ezel, Moone) are separated from the coast of the Estonian province by the big strait, or Moone-Sund, and from each other by the Small-Sund. The rivers of Livonia province belong to the basins of the Gulf of Riga and the Gulf of Finland. The former include the navigable Pernava with its tributaries Navast, Hallist and Reio; the Salis River, the outlet of Lake Burtnek, into which the rivers Ruijen and Zedde flow; the Svent-Uppe River, which flows directly into the Gulf of Riga and is connected to the Salis by the Neibach Channel. In addition, numerous lakes and coastal rivers 20–30 km long flow directly into the Gulf of Riga. The Livonian Aa, which is floating only for forests and only irrigates most of the southern half of the province in the spring, flows out into the Gulf of Riga. The Western Dvina River belongs to the Livonian province on its right bank only for 138 miles (147 km), from the confluence of the Evsta to its mouth which is formed by the port of Riga and both banks of which are within the province. and from which flows the Great Embach River, which connects the Wirtz-Yerw with the Peipus; it is the only navigable river in this basin.

Soil
The sponge soil is generally composed of sand, clay, marl, and chalk and should be termed sparsely fertile, only black earth occurs in places; in the lowlands the soil passes into meadow and moss bogs, and in places into peat bogs.

Erratic masses reach 20 feet (6.1 m) in diameter; the boulders are mostly rounded.

Forests
Pernov County is almost entirely covered by forests, passing also into the adjoining part of the Felin County. The forests extend from the border with the Governorate of Estonia in a wide strip to the south along the Pernov river basin, 400 (427 km) long and 70–90 miles wide in Volmari County to the shores of the Gulf of Riga. They also cover part of Riga County and the southern part of Wenden County along the Evsta river basin 250 versts (267 km) long and up to 60 versts (64 km) wide. The island of Ösel is the least forested.

The main forest species of the Livonian province are spruce and pine (reaching the size of a ship forest), birch, alder, ash, oak and willow. The preserved oaks of colossal size prove that in the past, this type of forest dominated in the gubernia; nowadays, the oak groves are preserved only in some places (the best in the Gokhrazen estate). At the present time, forest management and conservation works have been carried out everywhere in the Livonian province, which, however, started at the end of the last century. Forest easements, which have existed here for a long time, are also being eliminated vigorously. Artificial cultivation of forests is also developing. The forestry in the state forests is especially rational, occupying the area of about 210 thousand dessiatinas (2294 km2).

Swamps

A third of the entire area of the Livonian province, which is occupied by lowlands, is covered by bogs; of them the lowland meadow bogs (German: Wiesenmoor, Est. Soo, Lit. Purr) are passable only in summer and stretch along Lake Peipsi and the Gulf of Riga, as well as the rivers Pernava, Embachu, Dvina, and others; swampy meadows (Sumpfwiesen), mainly in the northern part of the province, follow the course of rivers; mossy bogs (Hochmoor) (German, Est. Hochmoor, Est. Rabba, Lit. Tirrul), actually peat bogs, are found in depressions and hollows mainly in Riga and Pernova counties, as well as on the south-western slopes of the Pebalga Heights; they are most common in Pernova (Netzi-Rabba, Laisma-Soo and Majamo-Soo) and Fellin (Pindrina-Soo and Pendara-Soo) counties, and least common in Vendena and Arensburg counties. The island of Ösel has fewer bogs than the rest of the Livonian province. Draining the bogs every year greatly reduces the space they occupy. In general, the bogs, mostly bare and mossy, occupy about 360 thousand dessiatinas (3933 km2), or 1/10 of the whole surface of the governorate.

Law

History

Following the capitulation of Estonia and Livonia in 1710, Peter the Great, on 28 July 1713, created the Riga Governorate which also included Smolensk uezd, Dorogobuzh uezd, Roslavl uezd and Vyazma uezd of Smolensk Governorate. Smolensk Province was created from territory in Smolensk Governorate at that time. It was incorporated into Smolensk Governorate when it was reformed in 1726.

Sweden formally ceded Swedish Livonia to Russia in 1721 with the Treaty of Nystad. In 1722 Dorpat County was added to Riga Governorate. In 1726 Smolensk Governorate was separated from Governorate, which now had five provinces: Riga, Wenden, Dorpat, Pernau and Ösel. In 1783 the Schlock County was added. On 3 July 1783 Catherine the Great reorganized Governorate into Riga Viceroyalty. Only in 1796, after the Third Partition of Poland this territory was renamed as the Governorate of Livonia.

Until the late 19th century the governorate was not ruled by Russian laws but was administered autonomously by the local German Baltic nobility through a feudal . German nobles insisted on preserving their privileges and use of the German language. In 1816 the serfs of Livonia were liberated by Tsar Alexander I, in a precursor to his plans for the rest of Russia.

After the Russian February Revolution in 1917, the northern part of the Governorate of Livonia was combined with the Governorate of Estonia to form a new Autonomous Governorate of Estonia. The independent Republic of Estonia (covering all of the previous Autonomous Governorate of Estonia) was declared on 24 February 1918, in the capital city Tallinn, one day before it was occupied by German troops during World War I.

With the Treaty of Brest-Litovsk on 3 March 1918, Bolshevik Russia accepted the loss of the Livland Governorate.

Administrative division 
The Governorate of Livonia was divided into 9 uezds ("counties").

The uezds were divided into uchastoks ("subcounties"), which were supervised by assistant chiefs of the district. Each uchastok had two upper peasant court districts, with the exception of the Ezelsky uezd, which had only one uchastok.

There were 17 uchastok commissioners in the counties, subordinate to the Livonian Peasant Affairs Commission.

The Livonian province was divided into five judicial districts: the districts of Riga-Volmar, Venden-Valk, Jurjev-Verro, Pernov-Fellini, and Ezel. There were 42 electoral districts.

The representative bodies of the volosts were the volost assemblies, which consisted of all the taxpayers in the volost, or elected assemblies, elected by the taxpayers in the volost; the executive of the volost was the volost foreman.

After the February Revolution the Russian Provisional Government issued the proclamation on 30 March 1917 "On the autonomy of Estland", according to which the Government of Livonia was divided: five northern counties with the Estonian population (Dorpat, Pernau, Fellin, Werro and Ösel) as well as the populated by the Estonians townships of Walk county were all included into the composition of the neighboring Governorate of Estonia. However the new border between the Governments of Estonia and Livonia was never properly demarcated.

Demographics

The bulk of the population were former landlord peasants, who were mainly engaged in arable farming and cattle breeding. Until 1804, they were completely dependent on the will of the landlord, from that year they received some personal rights, and in 1819 they were freed from serfdom; the right to use peasant land was granted to them in 1849. Since that time, corvee began to be replaced by dues and a local peasant bank was established, with the help of which the peasants acquire land as property.

Russian Empire census (1897) 
According to the Russian Empire Census of 1897, the Livonia Governorate had a population of 1,299,365, including 629,992 men and 669,373 women. The majority of the population indicated Latvian to be their mother tongue, with significant Estonian, German, and Russian speaking minorities.

Economy

The economy of the province came from shipbuilding, shipping, and fishing. Part of the population is engaged in seal fishing on Ruhnu-Runo and Schwarbe peninsula. Smaller industries such as trapping, poultry farming, trade and industry exist in the province.

Natural wealth 
Mineral wealth - mainly clays, gypsum, peat, swamp ironstone found near the Riga sulphur springs.

The flora of the province of Livonia is especially rich in summer around Fellin and Wenden. Of the islands of the Livonian province, the island of Ösel stands out for its abundance of flora.

Wild animals 
As the bogs have been drained, land cultivation spread and the forests decreased, the number of wild animals in the Livonian province was considerably decreased and some species were extinct such as the Wild boar. The most common animals are the following: bears, wolves, elk, foxes, martens and hares.

Native birds include: eagles, falcons, hawks, crows, magpies, owls, sparrows, pigeons, grouse, snipes and others. There are storks on Esel island.

Fisheries 
The Livonian province is not as rich in fish as northern Russia. The main objects of fishing are: marine species salakushka, then perch, sturgeon; and in smaller numbers burbot and flounder. Near the shores of Estland, near the Baltic port and near Riga large numbers of sprat are caught. River and lake species: salmon, lamprey, trout, vendace, navaga, perch, whitefish and others. Crayfish are abundant everywhere.

In the sea, salakushka and flounder are caught in great numbers, in Lake Peipsi, Virts-Järve, Luban and Burtnekskoe - whitefish, snets, vendace, ruffe, perch, sudak, koryushka and others. On Lake Peipsi there are more than 100,000 fishermen, mostly Russians, catching up to 150,000 barrels of snets alone annually; in the rivers salmon, lamprey (in Dvina). Salmon and snets are exported in large quantities outside the province.

Agriculture 
The Livonian province is very rich in bread products, of which the most used are: rye, barley everywhere, buckwheat in small quantities in the middle and southwestern parts. Root crops are bred in large numbers, of which the main one is potatoes.

Of the fibrous and oily ones: flax and hemp. The former is one of the most important native plants.

The herbs in the province of Livonia are unobtainable and of unsatisfactory quality. As a consequence of the scarcity of grasses in the province, an almost ubiquitous herb-growing has arisen, such as clover, timothy grass, corn pea. Vined grasses are abundant only on the island of Ösel.

The most common fruits are various varieties of apples, cherries, pears and plums.

From berries garden strawberries, raspberries, currants and others; hops are occasionally found.

The total land in 974 landowners and 120 church estates ( pastorates ) was considered in 1881-1883 3,147,216 acres ( 3,438,000 ha ).

The agriculture of the province reached a high level of development. Everywhere a multi-field, fruit-shifting economy was introduced with enhanced fertilizer of all kinds and drainage of fields. Irrigation was carried out, among other things, with the help of artesian wells, of which there were more than 300 in the Livland province. Grass sowing has long been widespread. Meadows with artificial grass and pastures, including drained swamps, covered 41.5% of the entire surface of the province. The yield of grain in some places is higher than in the best black-earth provinces. Dairy farming and cheese making developed, at the same time distilleries were closed. At the end of the 19th centuryfactories and plants processing the products of the animal kingdom are developing more and more in view of the spreading of correct cattle breeding; in 1890, cloth factories, dairy and cheese factories, tanneries and bone mills increased their productivity the most.

In 1888 there were 216,870 horses in the province, 401,498 cattle, 1,020,800 sheep, and 478,649 pigs. The cultivation of the fields was carried out by horses and partly by oxen. The local horse breeding breeds the native breed of kleper and doppel kleper. Sheep breeding developed; pig breeding has reached a high level of perfection. Among the secondary sectors of the economy, poultry farming played a large role, and beekeeping played a smaller role.

Cattle in Livland province are small and unsatisfactory; occasionally there are good breed bulls and cows. Horses are very unsatisfactory; the well- known breed of clapers has almost completely bred and survived only near Fellin, Ober Palen and on the island of Ezele.

Fish 
The Livonian province is less rich in fish than the lakes and rivers of northern Russia. The main subject of fishing: the marine species salakushka, then perch, sturgeon; in smaller numbers burbot and flounder. Near the shores of Estland, near the Baltic port and near Riga are caught in large numbers of sprat. River and lake species: salmon, lamprey, trout, vendace, navaga, perch, whitefish and others. Crayfish are abundant everywhere.

Governors
The Estonian province was governed by a governor appointed by the emperor. The representative body of local self-government is the Landtag, whose chairman was called the Landmarshal, the executive body is the Landrat College, which consisted of 12 landrats elected for life.

 1797 Baron Balthasar von Campenhausen
 1797 Count Ernst Burchard von Mengden
 1797 – 1808 Christoph Adam von Richter
 1808 – 1811 Ivan Nikolayevich Repyev
 1811 – 1827 Joseph Du Hamel
 1827 – 1829 Baron Paul Theodor von Hahn
 1829 Johann Ludwig Ferdinand von Cube (acting governor)
 1827 – 1847 Baron Georg Friedrich von Fölkesahm
 1847 Johann Ludwig Ferdinand von Cube (acting governor)
 1847 – 1862 Heinrich Magnus Wilhelm von Essen
 1862 – 1868 August Georg Friedrich von Oettingen
 1868 – 1871 Friedrich Woldemar von Lysander
 1871 – 1872 Julius Gustav von Cube (acting governor)
 1872 – 1874 Baron Mikhail Egorovich Vrangel
 1874 – 1882 Baron Alexander Karl Abraham von Uexküll-Güldenband
 1882 – 1885 Ivan Egorovich Shevich
 1885 Hermann Friedrich Johannes von Tobiesen (acting governor)
 1885 – 1895 Mihail Alekseyevich Zinoviev
 1895 – 1896 Aleksandr Nikolayevich Bulygin (acting governor)
 1896 – 1900 Vladimir Dmitrievich Surovtsev
 1900 – 1901 Aleksandr Nikolayevich Bulygin (acting governor)
 1901 – 1905 Mikhail Alekseyevich Pashkov
 1905 Pyotr Petrovich Neklyudov (acting governor)
 1905 Yakov Dmitrievich Bologovsky (acting governor)
 1905 – 1914 Nikolai Aleksandrovich Zvegintsov
 1914 – 1916 Arkady Ippolitovich Kelepovsky
 1916 Sergei Sergeyevich Podolinsky (acting governor)
 1916 – 1917 Nikolai Nikolayevich Lavrinovsky
 1917 Sergei Alekseyevich Shidlovsky

Education
In 1890, 86.61% of children of schooling age used correct education. In the same year, of the recruits accepted for service, there were 83 illiterate, and literate and semi-literate - 2458 people. Educational institutions in 1890 were 1959 with 137,285 students ; of which 74,514 men, or 54.23%, and 62,771 women, or 45.77%. There were 48,443 children studying at home under the supervision of the clergy ; thus, there are 185,728 students in total. In the 13th century, the Catholic church and school system spread in Estonia. At first, cathedral schools were established, traditionally teaching the liberal arts (the oldest known was the Pärnu cathedral school in 1251). Later, monastic schools were established. The education of the peasantry at that time remained at the level of 'folk pedagogy'. In 1630, the Tartu Gymnasium was opened, and in 1632 the University of Tartu.

In 1786, the Russian regulation on national schools was issued, which required the opening of a four-form upper-secondary school (five years of study) in the governorate towns and a two-form lower-secondary school (two years of study) in the county towns. The post of director of the national schools was created.

On 5 November 1804, the Emperor Alexander I approved the initial regulations for folk education. The Tartu Study Circle was created under the leadership of the curator Friedrich Maximilian von Klinger. The types of schools were defined and the basis for state supervision and management of schools was laid. A permanent four-tier system of public educational institutions was established: parish schools (elementary schools) (Estonian language of instruction), county schools (German language of instruction), governorate grammar schools (German language of instruction) and universities. The educational institutions in the province were:
 University of Yuriyev with 2095 students,
 Riga Polytechnic University with 1025 students,
 Veterinary Institute of Tērbat (Tartu Veterinary Institute) with 290 students, 
 School of Paramedics at the Veterinary Institute of Tērbat with 8 students,
 Riga Theological Seminary with 145 students,
 16 male gymnasia, 11 female gymnasia, 
 2 teachers' seminaries with 18 students (Vidzeme Teachers' Seminary in Valka, Tērbata Teachers' Seminary) 
 2 craft schools (in Riga) with 447 students,
 3 maritime schools with 245 students,
 48 county schools,
 222 private schools,
 140 Evangelical Lutheran church schools and 1087 parish schools, 
 125 Orthodox church schools and 242 parish schools,
 6 Jewish schools,
 6 Sunday schools,
 3 schools for the deaf

Infrastructure

Press
24 newspapers and periodicals are published (12 in Riga, 10 in Yuriev, 2 in Pernov), including several in Estonian and Latvian.

Healthcare
In 1890, there were 262 doctors in the province, of which 218 were free practitioners and 3 were women; pharmacies 104 (rural 43); there are hospitals in all county towns, from 20 to 60 beds. In Riga, apart from the prison hospital, there are 2 hospitals with 882 beds. At the Medical Faculty of Yuriev University, and at Rotenberg's dacha near Riga there is a mental hospital with 362 beds. Almshouses have been set up in Riga (8, for 1,200 persons) and in all county towns (7 in total).

Ports
In the governorate there were navigable bays and harbours: the port of Riga on the estuary of the Daugava River, the port of Pärnu on the estuary of the Pärnu River, and the ports of Kuressaare, Sõrve, Mustla and Maas in Saaremaa.

Railways
In the northern part of the governorate, in what is now southern Estonia, there were the Tapa-Tartu railway connecting the broad-gauge railway with the Tallinn-Narva railway in the Principality of Estonia, the Tartu-Valga railway and the Riga-Pskov railway, part of the Valga-Petseri railway. Narrow-gauge railway lines in South Estonia: between Valga-Ruhja-Pärnu, the Mõisaküla-Viljandi narrow-gauge branch and the Tallinn-Viljandi line connecting with the Estonian province.

Postal infrastructure
Postal traffic in Livonia was organised by the Livonian knighthood from the mid-17th century and by the governorate government from the 19th century. The governorate was criss-crossed by four postal routes, along which a network of postal stations was established.

See also

 Administrative divisions of Russia in 1713-1714
 Baltic governorates
 Courland Governorate
 Estonia Governorate
 Livonian Confederation

Notes

References

 
Governorates of the Russian Empire
Baltic governorates
18th century in Estonia
18th century in Latvia
1721 establishments in Russia
19th century in Latvia
19th century in Estonia
Geographic history of Latvia
Geographic history of Estonia